William Henry Stafford Jr. (born May 11, 1931) is a Senior United States district judge of the United States District Court for the Northern District of Florida.

Education and career

Born in Masury, Ohio, Stafford received a Bachelor of Science degree from Temple University in 1953 and a Bachelor of Laws from Temple University Beasley School of Law in 1956. He was in the United States Navy as a lieutenant (j.g.) from 1956 to 1960. He was in private practice in Pensacola, Florida from 1961 to 1969. He was an assistant city attorney of Pensacola in 1963. He was State Attorney for the First Judicial Circuit Court of Florida from 1967 to 1969. He was the United States Attorney for the Northern District of Florida from 1969 to 1975.

Federal judicial service

Stafford was nominated by President Gerald Ford on April 18, 1975, to a seat on the United States District Court for the Northern District of Florida vacated by Judge David Lycurgus Middlebrooks Jr. He was confirmed by the United States Senate on May 12, 1975, and received his commission on May 14, 1975. He served as chief judge from 1981 to 1993. He assumed senior status on May 31, 1996.

See also
 List of United States federal judges by longevity of service

References

Sources
 

1931 births
Living people
Judges of the United States District Court for the Northern District of Florida
Temple University alumni
United States Attorneys for the Northern District of Florida
United States district court judges appointed by Gerald Ford
20th-century American judges
United States Navy officers
Judges of the United States Foreign Intelligence Surveillance Court
State attorneys
21st-century American judges